Sanjabad-e Jonubi Rural District is in Firuz District of Kowsar County, Ardabil province, Iran. At the census of 2006, its population was 3,211 in 690 households; there were 3,054 inhabitants in 797 households at the following census of 2011; and in the most recent census of 2016, the population of the rural district was 2,395 in 691 households. The largest of its 26 villages was Firuzabad, with 489 people.

References 

Kowsar County

Rural Districts of Ardabil Province

Populated places in Ardabil Province

Populated places in Kowsar County